The Happy Horns of Clark Terry is an album by American jazz trumpet and flugelhorn player Clark Terry featuring performances recorded in March 1964 for the Impulse! label. Reissued in 2012 to commemorate the 50th anniversary of Impulse! Records, it resurfaced with Terry's only other record for the label as a solo leader, It's What's Happenin'.

Reception
The Allmusic review by Scott Yanow awarded the album 4 stars stating "This all-star CD has plenty of memorable moments... The lively music is quite enjoyable".

Track listing
 "Rockin' in Rhythm" (Harry Carney, Duke Ellington, Irving Mills) - 4:39
 "In a Mist" (Bix Beiderbecke) - 4:08
 "Return to Swahili" (Clark Terry) - 3:04
 "Ellington Rides Again: a. Don't Get Around Much Anymore; b. Perdido; c. I'm Beginning to See the Light" (a. Ellington, b. Juan Tizol, c. Ellington, Johnny Hodges, Harry James, Don George) - 2:56
 "Impulsive" (Hodges) - 4:40
 "Do Nothin' Till You Hear from Me (Ellington, Bob Russell) - 3:37
 "Jazz Conversations" (Buck Clayton, Bob Hammer) - 4:29
 "High Towers" (Henri Woode) - 3:48
 "Hammerhead Waltz" (Hammer) - 2:48
Recorded at the Van Gelder Studio in Englewood Cliffs, New Jersey on March 13, 1964

Personnel
Clark Terry - trumpet, flugelhorn
Phil Woods - alto saxophone, clarinet
Ben Webster – tenor saxophone
Roger Kellaway – piano
Milt Hinton – bass
Walter Perkins – drums

References

Impulse! Records albums
Clark Terry albums
1964 albums
Albums recorded at Van Gelder Studio
Albums produced by Bob Thiele